The 2020 OL Reign season is the team's eighth season of play and their eighth season in the National Women's Soccer League, the top division of women's soccer in the United States. It is the team's first season under new majority owner OL Groupe, the parent company of French football clubs Olympique Lyonnais and Olympique Lyonnais Féminin, and the resultant new team name.

After leading the team for the past two seasons, former head coach Vlatko Andonovski departed in October 2019 to become the head coach of the United States women's national soccer team. Frenchman Farid Benstiti was named the third head coach in team history in January 2020.

On March 12, 2020, the preseason match schedule was canceled due to the coronavirus pandemic. As a result, the NWSL announced on March 20 that the regular season start will be delayed.

On May 27, 2020, the NWSL announced that the 2020 Challenge Cup will mark the return to action following the COVID-19 pandemic. The 25-game tournament, to be held from June 27 to July 26, will be hosted by the owner of Utah Royals FC Dell Loy Hansen. Subsequently, OL Reign resumed team preseason training in Missoula, Montana, on June 1.

On June 22, 2020, the NWSL announced, in conjunction with the full rules and regulations for the 2020 Challenge Cup, that the 2020 NWSL regular season and playoffs have been canceled.

On August 25, 2020, the NWSL announced that the season will continue with the Fall Series, where the nine teams are divided into three regional pods and play four games each.

Team

Coaching staff

Current roster

Competitions 

All times are in PT unless otherwise noted.

Preseason

Thorns Spring Invitational

Regular season 
On February 25, 2020, the NWSL announced the full, 24-game schedule for the regular season. However, the regular season was delayed due to the COVID-19 pandemic. On June 22, 2020, the NWSL announced that the 2020 NWSL regular season and playoffs have been canceled.

Playoffs
On June 22, 2020, the NWSL announced that the 2020 NWSL regular season and playoffs have been canceled.

Challenge Cup

Preliminary round

Preliminary round standings

Knockout round

Fall Series

Standings

Appearances and goals

|-
|colspan="16" |Goalkeepers:
|-

|-
|colspan="16" |Defenders:
|-

|-
|colspan="16" |Midfielders:
|-

|-
|colspan="16" |Forwards:
|-

|-
|colspan="16" |Players who left the team during the season:
|-

|-
|colspan="16" |Own goals for:
|-

Transfers
For incoming transfers, dates listed are when OL Reign officially signed the players to the roster. Transactions where only the rights to the players are acquired (e.g., draft picks) are not listed. For outgoing transfers, dates listed are when OL Reign officially removed the players from its roster, not when they signed with another team. If a player later signed with another team, her new team will be noted, but the date listed here remains the one when she was officially removed from the OL Reign roster.

Transfers in

Draft picks
Draft picks are not automatically signed to the team roster. Only those who are signed to a contract will be listed as incoming transfers. Only trades involving draft picks and executed on the day of the 2020 NWSL College Draft will be listed in the notes.

Transfers out

Loans in

Loans out

New contracts

Awards

FIFA FIFPro Women's World 11

 Megan Rapinoe: World 11
 Shirley Cruz: shortlisted

BBC Women's Footballer of the Year
 Megan Rapinoe (nominee)

Women's International Champions Cup

 Best XI: Megan Rapinoe

References

External links 
 

OL Reign seasons
2020 in sports in Washington (state)
2020 National Women's Soccer League season
American soccer clubs 2020 season
Sports in Tacoma, Washington